Gervais Rioux (born 17 November 1960) is a Canadian former  road bicycle racer. He rode at the 1988 Summer Olympics. Rioux is the owner of Argon 18.

Professional Cycling Career 
From 1981 to 1990, Gervais Rioux represented Canada at major international events including the Commonwealth Games in 1982 and 1986 and the  1988 Summer Olympics in Seoul. Member of the Canadian Team throughout his senior career, Gervais Rioux took part in all the World Road Championships between 1981 and 1990. In all, he has accumulated more than 150 wins in some 1500 races and 18 years.

Honours 
Gervais Rioux was chosen athlete of the decade of the 1980s for the region of Eastern Quebec.
In November 2008, he was inducted into the Quebec Cycling Hall of Fame.

Palmarès 
1977
27th place the Canada Games
1978
Winner of the unique selection event for the Junior World Road Championships 
Winner of the Tour du Saguenay-Lac-Saint-Jean Junior
1979
Winner of the Junior World Road Championships 
Winner of the Tour du Saguenay-Lac-Saint-Jean Junior
1982
21st place at the Commonwealth Games
76th place at the World Road Championships
1983
Winner of the Tour of Luxembourg
Grand Prix de Vimy
27th position at the World Road Championships
3rd in Paris-Reims
1985
Winner of the Canadian Road Title
Winner of the Grand Prix Marc Blouin
Winner of two stages in the Mi-Août Bretonne
Grand Prix Toulon
33rd place at the World Road Championships 
1986
19th place at the Commonwealth Games
Winner of the Grand Prix Marc Blouin
76th position at the World Road Championships
1987
Winner of the Canadian Road Title
Winner of the Grand Prix Val Bélair
Winner of the Nevada City Classic (second Canadian to ever win this event)
27th place at the World Championships
1988
73rd in the  Olympic Games in Seoul
Winner of the  Grand Prix de Beauce
Winner of the Canada Cup
1989
Winner of the Tour du Saguenay-Lac-Saint-Jean
1990
2nd place in the Tour of Martinique

In the United States he won the Coconut Grove, Key Biscayne and South Miami Classic races.

Professional Cycling Teams 
Bike Sport (1983-1986)
Bloor Cycle (1986)
Ten Speed Drive (1987-1988)
Evian-Miko (1989-1990)

Bike shop and company 
Since 1989 he is the owner of Cycles Gervais Rioux’s bike shop. Along with his brother Martin Rioux, he founded the bicycle manufacturing company Argon 18, which sells bikes in over 70 countries.

Notes

References

External links 
 Gervais Rioux at Radsportseiten.net

Living people
1960 births
Canadian male cyclists
Cyclists from Quebec
Cyclists at the 1988 Summer Olympics
Commonwealth Games competitors for Canada
Cyclists at the 1982 Commonwealth Games
Cyclists at the 1986 Commonwealth Games
Olympic cyclists of Canada